Mount Pickering is a 13,474-foot-elevation (4,107 meter) mountain summit located just west of the crest of the Sierra Nevada mountain range in Tulare County, California. It is situated in Sequoia National Park, and is 3.1 miles (5.0 km) south of Mount Whitney, 1.2 mile (1.9 km) southeast of Mount Chamberlin, and one mile south of Mount Newcomb. Mt. Pickering ranks as the 65th highest summit in California. Topographic relief is significant as it rises nearly 2,000 feet above Sky Blue Lake in approximately one mile. This mountain's name was proposed by the Sierra Club and officially adopted in 1940 by the U.S. Board on Geographic Names to honor American astronomer Edward Charles Pickering (1846–1919). The immediate area has other geographical features named for astronomers, including Mount Newcomb, Mount Langley, Mount Young, and Mount Hale. The first ascent of the summit was made July 16, 1936, by Chester Versteeg, Tyler Van Degrift, and Oliver Kehrlein.

Climate
Mount Pickering has an alpine climate. Most weather fronts originate in the Pacific Ocean, and travel east toward the Sierra Nevada mountains. As fronts approach, they are forced upward by the peaks, causing them to drop their moisture in the form of rain or snowfall onto the range (orographic lift). Precipitation runoff from this mountain drains west to the Kern River via Rock Creek.

Gallery

See also

 List of the major 4000-meter summits of California

References

External links
 Weather forecast: Mount Pickering

Mountains of Tulare County, California
Mountains of Sequoia National Park
North American 4000 m summits
Mountains of Northern California
Sierra Nevada (United States)